IAR may refer to:
IAR Systems, an embedded system technology company
The Institute of Asian Research, an institute under the Faculty of Arts in the University of British Columbia, Vancouver, BC, Canada
"Ignore all rules", a policy on Wikipedia
Industria Aeronautică Română (IAR Braşov), an aerospace manufacturer
M27 Infantry Automatic Rifle, a new weapon design commissioned by the U.S. Marine Corps
Institute of Advanced Research, a private university in Gujarat, India
Instruction address register, an alternative name for the program counter CPU register
International Authority for the Ruhr, an organization in control of the industry in the Ruhr area from 1949 to 1952
International Affairs Review, an academic journal in the field of international affairs
Informacyjna Agencja Radiowa, a Polish news agency

The IATA code for the Tunoshna Airport, Yaroslavl Oblast, Russia
.iar, Inventory ARchive file used for avatar inventory backup in OpenSimulator virtual environments